Forum 66 is a twin tower complex in Shenyang, Liaoning.

The buildings were developed by Hang Lung Properties and share their Chinese name with other projects of Hang Lung, like Plaza 66.

References

External links 
 Profile at Hang Lung Group
 Hang Lung Plaza Twin Towers complex on Emporis.com
 Hang Lung Plaza Tower 1 on Emporis.com
 Hang Lung Plaza Tower 2 on Emporis.com

Buildings and structures under construction in China
Hang Lung Group
Skyscrapers in Shenyang
Kohn Pedersen Fox buildings
Skyscraper office buildings in China